The Beecham Group plc  was a British pharmaceutical company. It was once a constituent of the FTSE 100 Index. Beecham, after having merged with American pharmaceutical company SmithKline Beckman to become SmithKline Beecham, merged with Glaxo Wellcome to become GlaxoSmithKline (GSK). GSK still uses the Beechams brand name in the UK for its over-the-counter cold and flu relief products.

Early history
Beecham began as the family business of Thomas Beecham (1820–1907), a chemist. (Beecham would become the grandfather of music conductor Thomas Beecham, 1879–1961.) As a boy, Beecham worked as a shepherd, selling herbal remedies as a sideline.

He later became a travelling salesman or peddler full time. His first product was Beecham's Pills, a laxative, in 1842. Subsequent success enabled him to open a shop in Wigan in 1847.  Beecham opened its first factory in 1849, in St Helens, Lancashire, for the rapid production of medicines. Under his son, Sir Joseph Beecham, 1st Baronet (1848–1916), the business expanded, but remained a patent medicine company and engaged in little research.

Expansion and diversification
In 1924, Philip Hill, who made his money in real estate, acquired control of Beecham. Under his leadership, the company bought up other companies for their various products and for their marketing infrastructure, acquiring the Lucozade glucose drink and Macleans (toothpaste) in 1938, and, at the same time, introducing the Ribena blackcurrant drink. In 1938, it also bought the company selling Eno which had an extensive international presence.  By purchasing the company manufacturing Brylcreem the following year, the company added hair products for men to its offerings.

In 1943, Beecham decided to focus more on improving research and built Beecham Research Laboratories at Brockham Park, Surrey. In 1945, the company was renamed Beecham Group Ltd. in 1953, Beecham acquired C.L. Bencard, which specialised in allergy vaccines.

Antibiotics
In 1959, Brockham Park became famous when Beecham scientists there discovered the penicillin nucleus, 6-APA (6-aminopenicillanic acid); This discovery allowed Beecham, working in tandem with Bristol-Myers, to synthesize a number of new semisynthetic penicillins. Beecham marketed Broxil (phenethicillin), followed shortly by the more potent Celbenin (methicillin), which was active against Staphylococcus aureus. The group continued to focus on pharmaceutical development, producing further semi-synthetic penicillins. However, when Penbritin (ampicillin) came on the market in 1961, Beecham's facilities were soon inadequate for the worldwide demand for the drug. A  complex at Worthing came on line in the early 1960s, to produce phenethicillin, followed by the ability to produce 6-APA, the base for semisynthetic penicillins.

The company continued to add products, and acquire other companies, through the 1970s and 1980s. In 1971, the S. E. Massengill Company was acquired. Beecham launched Amoxil (amoxicillin) in 1972, which went on to become one of the most widely prescribed antibiotics.

In 1973, Aqua-fresh toothpaste was launched, and in 1977, the Sucrets brand was acquired. Augmentin, an antibiotic used to treat an array of bacterial infections, was introduced in 1981. The Aqua Velva and Geritol brands were acquired from J. B. Williams in 1982.

Later history
In 1986, the Beecham Group sold its numerous soft drink brands including Tango, Top Deck, Corona, and Quosh, as well as the UK franchises for Pepsi and 7 Up, to Britvic. The same year, Beecham acquired Norcliff Thayer from Revlon.

As the turn of the century approached, there were more significant mergers. In 1989, The Beecham Group plc and SmithKline Beckman merged to form SmithKline Beecham plc.  In 2000, SmithKline Beecham and GlaxoWellcome merged to form GlaxoSmithKline.

A history of the company, Beechams, 1848–2000: From Pills to Pharmaceuticals, written by Thomas Anthony Buchanan Corley, was published in 2011.

Products

Consumer healthcare

Pharmaceuticals

See also
 Pharmaceutical industry in the United Kingdom

References

External links
 

Pharmaceutical companies of the United Kingdom
GSK plc
Companies formerly listed on the London Stock Exchange